Mogulu is a populated place in the Western Province of Papua New Guinea. It has an airstrip. Until recently, cannibalism was practiced in the area.

References

Populated places in the Western Province (Papua New Guinea)
Cannibalism in Oceania